Don't Call Me Spinster (Spanish: No me digas solterona) is a 2018 Peruvian comedy film directed by Ani Alva H, starring Patricia Barreto, Angélica Aragón, Flavia Laos and Gino Pesaressi, with André Silva, Javier Saavedra and Marisol Aguirre in supporting roles.

Plot
Located in modern Lima, Peru; No me digas solterona tells the story of thirty-something-single businesswoman Patricia, believes that her boyfriend is going to propose to her. Instead, he asks for a "break" in their relationship. She's forced to return to live with her loving and wise over-protective mother; Tencha, and to listen to everyone's opinion of what she ought to do next.

Cast
 Patricia Barreto - Patricia
 Angélica Aragón - Tencha
 Marisol Aguirre - María García 
 Natalia Salas - Mariana
 Anahí de Cárdenas - Sol
 Flavia Laos - Belén 
 Rodrigo Sánchez Patiño - Richi
 André Silva - José 
 Fiorella Rodriguez - Meche
 Tito Vega - Mozo
 Yiddá Eslava - Chio
 Maricarmen Marin - Milagros
 Gino Pesaressi - Ignacio
 Javier Saavedra - Fernando 
 Christian Rivero - Sergio
 Adolfo Aguilar - Guianluca
 Claret Quea - Mota

Filming
The movie was filmed on location in Lima, Peru.

Home media

The film will be released on Blu-ray Disc in 2018.

References

External links
 

2018 films
2018 comedy films
Peruvian comedy films
Big Bang Films films
2010s Peruvian films
2010s Spanish-language films